Merrimac Square is located in the center of the town of Merrimac, Massachusetts. It is the commercial, cultural and historical center of the town.

The main events of the town, including the Merrimac Santa Parade and Merrimac Old Home Days, are held in the square.

The Square joins East and West Main Streets, as well as Church Street and School Street. There was previously only a concrete island in the center of the roadway, with a flagpole at the center. The two banks, one of them in a building dating back to the 1800s, are located at the entrance to West Main Street. The police and fire station are located near the entrance to East Main Street.

In mid-2015, the town square was renovated, changing the open roadway of the square into a small rotary, as well as implementing a new water main and sidewalks compliant with the ADA.

References

External links
 Town of Merrimac, Massachusetts
 Merrimac Historical Museum
 Merrimac Public Library

Buildings and structures in Essex County, Massachusetts
Squares in the United States